Wingate Quarry is a biological Site of Special Scientific Interest in the County Durham district of east County Durham, England.

Part of the site is also a Local Nature Reserve

It is a disused quarry located just south of the village of Wheatley Hill.

The quarry was worked for Magnesian Limestone until the 1930s, when it closed. Since then a large and varied grassland has developed on the site. Magnesian limestone grassland is nationally scarce, with this site accounting for close to 8 percent of the national total. As well as species that are characteristic of this vegetation type, there are also two orchids, fragrant orchid, Gymnadenia conopsea, and frog orchid, Coeloglossum viride, both of which are uncommon in County Durham.

References

Sites of Special Scientific Interest in County Durham
Local Nature Reserves in County Durham
Quarries in County Durham
Wheatley Hill